Malik Mohammad Habib Khan is a former officer of the Police Service of Pakistan who served as Inspector General of Police. He has also served as the Federal Interior Minister of Pakistan in the caretaker government of 2013.

Having served in Pakistan Army as Capt-Maj. was inducted in Police Service of Pakistan (PSP) and had risen to the position of Inspector General of Police. Served as IGP Balochistan, Pakistan Railways and Azad Jammu & Kashmir. His performance as Federal Interior Minister has been rated as outstanding by the International Community forum of United Kingdom and he was honoured an International award in British Parliament on 2 July 2013 for ensuring smooth and peaceful Elections in the country against serious security threats and challenges.

Life and early education

He was born in Kahuta, District Rawalpindi in the Awan (tribe). His grandfather was in the British Army. His first cousin Flight Lieutenant Ghulam Murtaza Malik (Shaheed) was declared as the martyr of Indo-Pakistani War of 1971 and received Tamgha-i-Jurat. His ancestor migrated from Pind Dadan Khan in the 16th century. Malik Habib was also a bright student, and Completed his Matriculation with distinction from Punjab Board and his name is displayed on the honour board of the school.

He completed BSc (Physics & Mathematics) from University of the Punjab.

Professional life
He was commissioned in the Pakistan Army in the 37th PMA (Pakistan Military Academy) and served on various assignment with last one as Major Pakistan Army, ISI (Inter-Services Intelligence) before being inducted in Police services of Pakistan.

Police Service of Pakistan 

He was inducted in PSP (Police Service of Pakistan) in 1976 as Superintendent of Police, and served as Superintendent of Police in Punjab, Deputy Inspector General of Police of Crimes & Special Branch in Balochistan and then promoted to three-star rank of the Police Service of Pakistan as IGP (inspector-general of police).

He served in federation as below before being placed as Federal Interior Minister

 IGP (inspector-general of police) Balochistan, Pakistan
 IGP (inspector-general of police)  Azad Jammu and Kashmir.
 IGP (inspector-general of police) Pakistan Railways Police 
 Director General Joint- IB (Intelligence Bureau).
 Federal Director FIA (Federal Investigation Agency)

Other key posts

He was Member of Prime Minister (Chief Executive) Inspection Commission. He was appointed as Managing Director of PTDC (Pakistan Tourism Development Corporation) in 2003. As MD PTDC, he inked an agreement with A.J.S. Sahney, Chairman and Managing-Director of the Delhi Transport Corporation (DTC) for the regulation of bus service between Lahore and New Delhi, for another five years on January 13, 2014.

In 2005, he was appointed as Executive Director of NIPS (National Institute of Population Studies). Later in 2007, he was appointed as Executive Director of KESC (Karachi Electric Supply Company).

International conferences attended 

During his service, he attended the following International Conferences.

–	Represented Pakistan on WTO (World Tourism Organization) forum as managing director PTDC, and held meeting with Secretary General WTO at Beijing on matter of mutual interest pertaining to promotion of tourism in Pakistan.

–	Represented Pakistan in restoration of Samjhauta Express with India in 2004, as managing director PTDC.

–	Conducted K2 Golden Jubilee in 2004 which reflected the soft image of Pakistan in western Countries, particularly Europe, as Manage Director PTDC.

–	Represented Pakistan in USA in April 1990 on immigration matters of mutual interest and held meeting with Assistant Secretary of State and Commissioner of INS of USA Washington D.C.

–	Maintained Security Liaison with S.L.O of USA/UK and other allied countries during cold war arena from 1983 to 1988 while heading counter intelligence set up in Karachi and Islamabad.

Training and Courses

He successfully completed following Local and International courses.

International

Local

House of Commons UK

Former Federal Interior Minister and International Award 

On 2 April 2013, he was appointed Federal Minister for Interior and Narcotics Minister of Pakistan. His responsibility was to conduct free and fair election in country.

British House of Lords announced giving international award to him for ensuring smooth and peaceful polls in country. British award recognizes services of Malik Habib for peaceful conduct of general election 2013.

References

Media links

Media Profile : https://sites.google.com/view/malik-habib-interior-minister-/home
Profile of Malik Muhammad Habib Khan
Notable Alumni Pakistan Military Academy

Living people
Federal Investigation Agency agents
Interior ministers of Pakistan
Pakistan Army officers
People from Rawalpindi District
University of the Punjab alumni
Year of birth missing (living people)